Eudmeta is a genus of flies in the family Stratiomyidae.

Species
Eudmeta brunnea Meijere, 1904
Eudmeta coerulemaculata Yang, Wei & Yang, 2010
Eudmeta diadematipennis Brunetti, 1923
Eudmeta marginata (Fabricius, 1805)

References

Stratiomyidae
Brachycera genera
Taxa named by Christian Rudolph Wilhelm Wiedemann
Diptera of Asia